The 2022–23 National First Division (called the Motsepe Foundation Championship for sponsorship reasons) is the season from September 2022 to May 2023 of South Africa's second tier of professional soccer, the National First Division.

Previous sponsors GladAfrica pulled out after three years of their five-year deal, and were replaced by Patrice Motsepe, with the competition being renamed the Motsepe Foundation Championship.

Teams

Team changes

The following teams have changed division since the 2021–22 season.

Promoted to 2021–22 South African Premier Division
 Richards Bay

Relegated from 2021–22 South African Premier Division
 Baroka

Promoted from 2021–22 SAFA Second Division
 MM Platinum
 Magesi

Relegated from 2021–22 National First Division
 TS Sporting
 Jomo Cosmos

Purchased statuses
 Free State Stars sold their status to Casric Stars

Stadiums and locations

16 teams are competing in the season.

Table

Results

Statistics

See also
2022-23 South African Premier Division

References

External links
PSL NFD
The NFD

National First Division seasons
South
2021–22 in South African soccer leagues